Pisanica may refer to:

 Pisanica (Croatian), the easter egg ritual in Croatia
 Pisanica, Gmina Ełk, settlement in northern Poland
 Pisanica, Gmina Kalinowo, settlement in northern Poland